İzzet Türkyılmaz (born 20 May 1990) is a Turkish professional basketball player for Samsunspor of the Turkish Basketball First League. Standing at 2.13 m (7 ft 0 in), he can play as a power forward or center.

Professional career
On 2 September 2013 Türkyılmaz signed a three-year contract with option to extend for one season with Fenerbahçe Ülker.

On 26 November 2014 Türkyılmaz signed with Le Mans Sarthe Basket. On 2 January 2015 Türkyılmaz was not extended by Le Mans and became a free agent. During his stint with the French team he averaged 2.1 points and 1.7 rebounds per game. On 22 January he signed with Croatian club GKK Šibenik. He averaged 10 points, 5.6 rebounds and 1.8 blocks per game.

On 25 September 2015 Türkyılmaz signed with Galatasaray Odeabank, making his return to the Turkish League. On 29 January 2016 he was loaned to TED Ankara Kolejliler for the rest of the season.

On 14 August 2016 Türkyılmaz returned to GKK Šibenik.

Türkyılmaz signed with Bursaspor in 2019. On 14 November 2020, he signed with Balıkesir Büyükşehir Belediyespor of the Turkish Basketball First League.

On 12 January 2022, Türkyılmaz signed with Samsunspor of the TBL.

NBA
On 28 June 2012 Türkyılmaz was selected by the Denver Nuggets with the 50th overall pick in the 2012 NBA draft. He then joined the Nuggets for the 2012 NBA Summer League Team in Las Vegas, Nevada.

Turkish national team
Türkyılmaz is also a member of Turkish national team, playing the FIBA EuroBasket 2011 tournament,  averaging 1.3 points and 2.3 rebounds per game.

References

External links
 İzzet Türkyılmaz at euroleague.net
 İzzet Türkyılmaz at fiba.com
 İzzet Türkyılmaz at TBLStat.net
 

1990 births
Living people
Bandırma B.İ.K. players
Bursaspor Basketbol players
Centers (basketball)
Competitors at the 2013 Mediterranean Games
Denver Nuggets draft picks
Turkish expatriate basketball people in Croatia
Fenerbahçe men's basketball players
Galatasaray S.K. (men's basketball) players
GKK Šibenik players
Mediterranean Games gold medalists for Turkey
Mediterranean Games medalists in basketball
People from Ayvalık
Power forwards (basketball)
Small forwards
Turkish expatriate basketball people in France
Turkish men's basketball players